Aidan is the anglicised version of the Irish male given name Aodhán. Phonetic variants, such as spelled with an "e" instead of an "a", have become widespread. The Irish language female equivalent is Aodhnait.

Etymology and spelling
The name is derived from the name Aodhán, which is a pet form of Aodh. The personal name Aodh means "fiery" and/or "bringer of fire" and was the name of a Celtic sun god (see Aed).

Formerly common only in Ireland, Scotland and Wales, the name and its variants have become popular in England, the United States, Canada, and Australia. In the 2010s, Aiden rose to the 13th most popular name in the United States as the given name to 129,433 boys while Aidan ranked 156th as the given name to 25,399 boys. In the 2000s, Aiden was 54th most popular name in the United States as the given name to 83,527 boys while Aidan ranked 55th having been bestowed on 76,493 boys. Other variants are a bit less popular, such as Hayden 87th, Ayden 156th, Aden 333rd, Aydan 808th, and Aydin 960th, according to the United States Social Security Database. "Aidan/Aiden" was the most popular boys' name in Canada in 2007.

Its popularity is also reflected in the occurrence of similar-sounding names such as Braden, Caden, Hayden, and Jayden.

Aidan (or any reasonable variant) as a girl's name does not appear in the top one thousand names for girls from the same database, although it has occasionally been used for girls.

Given name

Middle Ages
 Áedán mac Gabráin (ruled c. 574–609), King of Dál Riata, sometimes anglicised as Aidan of Dalriada
 Aeddan ap Blegywryd (died 1018), Welsh prince of Gwynedd
 Adam, Earl of Angus (ruled from before c. 1189)
 Saint Máedóc of Ferns (550–632), also known as Áedan
 Saint Aidan of Lindisfarne (died 651), Irish missionary and Bishop

Modern times

Arts and entertainment
Aidan Baker (born 1974/1975), Canadian musician
Aidan Banks, English guitarist
 Aidan Browne, Northern Irish television presenter
 Aidan Bryant (born 1987), American comedian
 Aidan Cassar (born 1999), Maltese singer-songwriter
 Aidan Chambers (born 1934), English author
 Aidan Coffey, Irish musician
 Aidan Coleman (born 1976), Australian poet and speechwriter
 Aidan Connolly (born 1991), Irish fiddler and teacher
 Aidan Cooney, Irish television presenter
 Aiden Curtiss (born 1998), British-American fashion model
 Aidan J. David (born 1981), English actor
 Aidan Davis (born 1997), English street dancer, rapper, and television host
 Aidan Devine, Canadian film actor
 Aiden Dillard, American film director and artist
 Aidan Dunne, Irish art critic
 Aidan Fennessy (died 2020), Australian playwright, stage director, and actor
 Aiden Flowers (born 2004), American actor
 Aidan Gallagher (born 2003), American actor
 Aidan Gillen (born 1968), Irish actor
 Aidan Gillett (born 1986), Australian actor
 Aidan Girt, Canadian drummer
 Aidan Gould (born 1996), American actor
 Aiden Grimshaw (born 1991), English musician
 Aidan Hartley (born 1965), British author and journalist
 Aiden J. Harvey (born 1944), English comedian
 Aidan Hawken (born 1975), American musician
 Aidan Higgins (1927–2015), Irish writer
 Aidan Hughes (born 1956), English artist
 Aiden James (born 1982), American pop singer
 Aidan A. Kelly (born 1940), American academic, poet, and influential figure
 Aidan Knight (born 1986), Canadian musician
 Aidan Laprete (born 2001), American singer, songwriter, actor, and record producer
 Aiden Leslie (born 1977), American pop singer-songwriter
 Aidan Mathews (born 1956), Irish poet and dramatist
 Aidan McArdle (born 1970), Irish actor
 Aidan Meehan, Irish artist and author
 Aidan Moffat (born 1973), Scottish musician
 Aidan O'Rourke (born 1975), Scottish musician
 Aidan Power (born 1979), Irish television and radio presenter
 Aidan Quinn (born 1959), American actor
 Aidan Salahova (born 1964), Azeri-Russian artist and gallerist
 Aiden Shaw (born 1966), English author, model, and pornographic film actor
 Aidan Shipley (born 1992), Canadian actor and filmmaker
 Aiden Thomas, American author
 Aidan Turner (born 1983), Irish actor
 Aiden Turner (born 1977), English actor
 Aidan Zammit (born 1965), Maltese musician
 Aiden Zhane (born 1990), American drag performer

Politics
 Aidan Burley (born 1979), British politician
 Aidan Crawley (1908–1993), British politician, journalist, television executive, and editor
 Aidan Davitt (born 1978), Irish politician
 Aidan Eames, Irish politician and solicitor
 Aidan Key (born 1964), American educator, author, speaker, and community organizer
 Aidan Kohn-Murphy (born 2004), American political activist and TikTok content creator
 Aidan Larkin (born 1946), Irish politician
 Aidan Maloney (1920–2018), Canadian politician
 Aidan McGrath, Irish youth activist
 Aidan McLindon (born 1980), Australian politician
 Aidan McQuade, Irish politician
 Aidan O'Connor, Irish politician
 Aidan O'Neill (born 1961), Scottish advocate, barrister, and King's Counsel

Religion
 Aidan Cross (1918–1989), Anglican religious leader in South Africa
 Francis Aidan Gasquet (1846–1929), English cardinal
 Aidan Kelly (born 1940), American Wiccan
 Aidan Nichols (born 1948), English academic and Catholic priest
 Aiden Wilson Tozer (1897–1963), American preacher
 Aidan Troy, Irish Catholic priest

Sports
Aidan Apodaca (born 1996), American soccer player
Aidan Baker (born 1964), English cricketer
Aidan Barlow (born 2000), English footballer
Aiden Blizzard (born 1984), Australian cricketer
Aiden Bonar (born 1999), Australian rules footballer
Aidan Brady (1930–1993), Irish Gaelic football goalkeeper
Aidan Breen, Fermanagh Gaelic footballer
Aidan Brooker (born 1995), South African cricketer
Aidan Browne (born 1998), Irish Gaelic footballer
Aidan Burrell (born 2003), English rugby league footballer
Aidan Butler (born 1974), Irish hurler
Aiden Butterworth (born 1961), English footballer
Aiden Cairns (1917–1992), Australian rugby league footballer
Aidan Caves (born 1995), Canadian track cyclist
Aidan Chippendale (born 1992), English footballer
Aidan Coleman (born 1988), Irish jockey
Aidan Collins (born 1986), English footballer
Aidan Connolly (born 1995), Scottish footballer
Aidan Corr (born 1994), Australian rules footballer
Aiden labaume (born 2012), American basketball player
Aidan Coyne (born 2003), Australian footballer
Aidan Cummins (born 1979), Irish hurler
Aidan Daly (born 1978), New Zealand basketball player
Aidan Daniels (born 1998), Canadian soccer player
Aidan Davison (born 1968), British football goalkeeper and coach
Aidan de Brune (1874–1946), Australian writer and long-distance walker
Aidan Devaney, Sligo Gaelic football goalkeeper
Aidan Dorgan (born 1973), Irish Gaelic footballer and manager
Aidan Downes (born 1988), Irish footballer
Aidan Edwards (born 2001), Australian footballer
Aiden English (born 1987), American color commentator and wrestler
Aidan Fennelly, Irish Gaelic footballer
Aidan Ferris (born 1996), Scottish footballer
Aidan Fitzgerald (born 1980), Irish Gaelic footballer
Aidan Fitzpatrick (born 2001), Scottish footballer
Aidan Flanagan (born 1974), Irish hurler
Aidan Fogarty (born 1982), Irish hurling player
Aidan Fogarty (born 1958), Irish hurling player
Aidan Fulton (born 1994), Scottish footballer
Aidan Guerra (born 1988), Australian rugby league player
Aidan Harte (born 1988), Irish hurler
Aidan Healy, Irish hurler
Aidan Heaney (born 1969), English footballer and coach
Aidan Heslop (born 2002), British high diver
Aidan Hutchinson (born 2000), American football player
Aidan Igiehon (born 2000), Irish basketball player
Aidan Jenniker (born 1989), South African footballer
Aidan Kearney (born 1979), Irish rugby union player
Aidan Kearney (born 1984), Irish hurler
Aidan Keena (born 1999), Irish footballer
Aidan Kelly (born 1994), American luger
Aidan Kirk (born 1986), New Zealand rugby league player
Aidan Lennon, Irish Gaelic football goalkeeper
Aidan Liu (born 2000), American soccer player
Aidan Lyons (1878–1910), South African cricketer
Aiden Maher (born 1946), English footballer
Aiden Markram (born 1994), South African cricketer
Aiden Marsh (born 2003), English professional footballer
Aidan McAdams (born 1999), Scottish football goalkeeper
Aiden McCabe (born 1987), Irish hurler
Aidan McCaffery (born 1957), English footballer
Aidan McCarry (born 1963), Irish hurler
Aidan McCarthy (born 2000), Irish hurler
Aidan McCormack (born 1992), Irish hurler
Aidan McCullen (born 1977), Irish rugby player
Aidan McDonough (born 1999), American ice hockey player
Aiden McFadden (born 1998), American soccer player
Aiden McGeady (born 1986), Irish footballer
Aidan McHugh (born 2000), British tennis player
Aidan McMullan (born 1997), Canadian rugby union player
Aiden Mesias (born 1999), English footballer
Aiden Moffat (born 1996), British racing driver
Aidan Morgan (born 2001), New Zealand rugby union player
Aidan Morris (born 2001), American soccer player
Aiden Morris (born 1993), English cricketer
Aidan Murphy (footballer) (born 1967), English footballer and coach
Aidan Murphy (born 2003), Australian sprinter
Aidan Newhouse (born 1972), English footballer
Aidan Nesbitt (born 1997), Scottish footballer
Aidan Nolan (born 1993), Irish hurler
Aidan Nugent, Armagh Gaelic footballer
Aidan O'Brien (born 1969), Irish horse-racing trainer
Aidan O'Brien, Irish Gaelic footballer and manager
Aiden O'Brien (born 1993), English footballer
Aidan O'Connell (born 1998), American football player
Aidan O'Halloran, Irish rugby union player
Aidan O'Kane (born 1979), Northern Irish footballer
Aidan O'Mahony (born 1982), Irish Gaelic footballer
Aiden O'Neill (born 1998), Australian football player
Aidan O'Rourke (born 1976), Irish Gaelic footballer and manager
Aidan O'Shea (Kerry Gaelic footballer) (born 1985), Irish Gaelic footballer
Aidan O'Shea (Mayo Gaelic footballer) (born 1990), Irish Gaelic footballer
Aidan O'Sullivan (born 1987), Irish Gaelic footballer
Aidan Olivier (born 1984), South African cricketer
Aiden Palmer (born 1987), English footballer
Aidan Parker (born 1983), Australian rules footballer
Aidan Price (born 1981), Irish footballer
Aidan Riley (born 1991), Australian rules footballer
Aidan Roach (born 1990), Australian water polo player
Aidan Roark (1905–1984), Irish polo player
Aidan Ross (born 1995), New Zealand rugby league player
Aidan Ryan (Tipperary hurler) (born 1965), Irish hurler
Aidan Ryan (Cork hurler) (born 1986), Irish hurler
Aidan Sarikaya (born 1996), New Zealand field hockey player
Aidan Sezer (born 1991), Turkish-Australian rugby league player
Aidan Smith (born 1997), Scottish footballer
Aidan Somers (born 1946), Irish hurler
Aidan Stone (born 1999), English football goalkeeper
Aidan Thomas, English footballer
Aiden Tolman (born 1988), Australian rugby league player
Aidan Toua (born 1990), Papua New Guinean rugby player
Aidan Treacy (born 1991), Irish hurler
Aidan Tuite (born 1983), Irish Gaelic footballer
Aiden Wagner (born 1994), Australian motorcycle racer
Aidan Walsh (born 1990), Irish hurler and Gaelic footballer
Aidan Walsh (born 1997), Northern Irish boxer
Aidy White (born 1991), Irish footballer
Aidan Wilson (born 1999), Scottish footballer
Aidan Zingel (born 1990), Australian volleyball player
Aidan Zittersteijn (born 1999), Cook Island lawn bowler

Other 
 Aiden Aslin (born 1994), British Ukrainian soldier
 Aidan Bellenger (born 1950), English historian, schoolmaster, and Benedictine monk
 Aiden Byrne (born 1972), English chef
 J. Aidan Carney (born 1934), Irish pathologist
 Aidan Delgado (born 1981), American soldier and anti-war activist
 Aidan Dodson (born 1962), English Egyptologist and historian
 Aidan Heavey (born 1953), Irish businessman
 John Aidan Liddell (1888–1915), English pilot
 Aidan MacCarthy (1914–1992), Irish doctor
 Aidan McAnespie (1965–1988), Irish victim of the Troubles
 Aidan Southall (1920–2009), British cultural anthropologist
 Aidan Sprot (1919–2021), British Army officer
 Aidan White (born 1951), British journalist

Fictional characters
 "Aidan" (The Inside episode), the title of episode 9 of the American television series The Inside
 Aidan Brosnan, fictional character played by Sean Maguire in the British soap opera EastEnders
 Aiden Burn, fictional female character in the American television series CSI: NY
 Aiden Dennison, fictional character in the American television series South of Nowhere
 Aidan Devane, fictional character played by Aiden Turner in the American soap opera All My Children
 Aiden Ford, fictional character in the Canadian television series Stargate Atlantis
 Aidan Foster, fictional character in the Australian soap opera Neighbours
 Aiden Lucas, fictional character in the American television series Ghost Whisperer
 Aidan Lynch, fictional character in the novel Harry Potter and the Goblet of Fire by J.K. Rowling
 Aiden Pearce, protagonist in the video game Watch Dogs
 Aidan Shaw, fictional character played by John Corbett in the American television series Sex and the City
 Aidan Waite, fictional character in the American Syfy drama/horror Being Human

See also
 St. Aidan's (disambiguation)
 Aiden, an American band
 Aiden Lair, historic property in Minerva, NY where Theodore Roosevelt stopped on his way to take the Oath of President at Buffalo (Sept. 14, 1901)
W.H.L. McCourtie Estate, originally called Aiden Lair in Somerset Center, Michigan
 Pamela Aidan, pen name of American fiction writer Pamela Mogen (born 1953)
 List of Irish-language given names
 Adin
 Aidin (name)
 Aydin (name)

References

Irish masculine given names
Scottish masculine given names
English masculine given names

de:Aidan
it:Aidano (nome)